Ahmadabad (also Romanized as Aḩmadābād; also known as Khar Gūneh (Persian: خرگونه), Khar Gooneh, and Khar Gāneh) is a village in Abdan Rural District, in the Central District of Deyr County, Bushehr Province, Iran. At the 2006 census, its population was 94, in 13 families.

References 

Populated places in Deyr County